Frederick Eckstein (February 17, 1861 in Perchtoldsdorf, Lower Austria – November 10, 1939 in Vienna) was an Austrian polymath,  theosophist and a friend and temporary co-worker of Sigmund Freud. Emil Molt states: 'He was the benefactor of Bruckner and Hugo Wolf, indeed the right arm of Bruckner, taking care that affairs went smoothly. He was a world traveller, had mastered Ju-jitsu and taught himself all sorts of difficult tricks. The story went around that he had trained himself to jump off a fast moving train without getting hurt. He too, was a highly gifted mathematician and a learned man in many respects.'

Also the husband of fellow theosophist and writer Bertha Diener, Eckstein's penchant for occultism first became evident as a member of a vegetarian group which discussed the doctrines of Pythagoras and the Neo-Platonists in Vienna at the end of the 1870s. His esoteric interests later extended to German and Spanish mysticism, the legends surrounding the Templars and the freemasons, Wagnerian mythology and oriental religions.
In 1889, in the week after the tragedy at Mayerling, in which  Crown Prince Rudolf of Austria, and his mistress were found dead in mysterious circumstances,  he and his friend, the composer Anton Bruckner (for whom he also served as private secretary) traveled to the monastery of Stift Heiligenkreuz to ask the abbot there for details of what happened.

Eckstein's book on Anton Bruckner was published in 1923.

References 

Emil Molt 'The life and times of Rudolf Steiner'

1861 births
1939 deaths
People from Mödling District
Austrian Jews
19th-century Austrian writers
Austrian Theosophists
Austrian male writers
Sigmund Freud